National road 4 (abbreviated as DK4) is a route belonging to the Polish national road network. The highway connects the southern regions of Poland. It runs from Jędrzychowice near Zgorzelec at the German border to Korczowa at the Ukrainian border, as the A4 motorway. National road 4 is a component of European highway E40.

The A4 motorway has been completed in July 2016, therefore entire former road 4 has been renumbered as national route 94.

Major cities and towns along the route 
 Zgorzelec (road 30, 94)
 Legnica (road 3)
 Kostomłoty (road 5)
 Bielany Wrocławskie (road 5, 35)
 Opole
 Gliwice (motorway A1, 44, 78, 408)
 Katowice (road 81, 86)
 Mysłowice (expressway S1)
 Chrzanów (road 79)
 Kraków (road 7, 44, 94)
 Targowisko (road 75)
 Brzesko (road 75)
 Tarnów (road 73)
 Pilzno (road 73)
 Rzeszów (road 9, 19, road 97)
 Jarosław (road 94)
 Radymno (road 77)
 Korczowa, border with Ukraine

04